The Dale Wright Award for Distinguished, Professional and Exceptional Career Service to NATCA and the National Airspace System is an award presented by the National Air Traffic Controllers Association (NATCA) to honor an extraordinary, positive impact made on the organization's ability to call the National Airspace System the world’s safest. It is named after NATCA's former director of safety and technology, Dale Wright. It was first awarded to Dale Wright in 2012.

List of people that received the Dale Wright Award

See also

 List of aviation awards

External links 

 www.Natca.org

References 

Aviation awards
Air traffic control in the United States
Awards established in 2012
2012 establishments in the United States